Jones Branch is a stream in Nodaway County in the U.S. state of Missouri. It is a tributary of One Hundred and Two River.

Jones Branch has the name of an early citizen.

See also
List of rivers of Missouri

References

Rivers of Nodaway County, Missouri
Rivers of Missouri